UWP may refer to:

Education
 University of Wisconsin–Parkside, located in Somers, Wisconsin, US
 University of Wisconsin–Platteville, located in Platteville, Wisconsin, US
 Up with People, an education organization with headquarters in the US

Information technology
 Universal Windows Platform, platform-homogeneous application architecture created by Microsoft and first introduced in Windows 10

Politics
 United Workers' Party (disambiguation)
 Mapam (United Workers' Party), in Israel
 Polish United Workers' Party, in Poland
 United Workers' Party (Dominica), in Dominica
 United Workers Party (Saint Lucia), in Saint Lucia